Ankit Chaudhary (born 21 December 1996) is an Indian cricketer. He made his Twenty20 debut for Uttar Pradesh in the 2018–19 Syed Mushtaq Ali Trophy on 24 February 2019. He made his List A debut on 7 October 2019, for Uttar Pradesh in the 2019–20 Vijay Hazare Trophy.

References

External links
 

1996 births
Living people
Indian cricketers
Uttar Pradesh cricketers
Place of birth missing (living people)